This is a list of countries with overseas military bases.

Background
The establishment of military bases abroad enables a country to project power, e.g. to conduct expeditionary warfare, and thereby influence events abroad. Depending on their size and infrastructure, they can be used as staging areas or for logistical, communications and intelligence support. Many conflicts throughout modern history have resulted in overseas military bases being established in large numbers by world powers and the existence of bases abroad has served countries that have then them in achieving political and military goals.

The British Empire and other colonial powers established overseas military bases in many of their colonies during the First and Second World Wars, where useful, and actively sought rights to facilities where needed for strategic reasons. At one time, establishing coaling stations for naval ships was important. During the Cold War, the United States of America and the Soviet Union established military bases where they could within their respective spheres of influence, and actively sought influence where needed. More recently, the War on Terror has resulted in overseas military bases being established in the Middle East.

Whilst the overall number of overseas military bases has fallen since 1945, the United States of America, Turkey, the United Kingdom, Russia and France still possess or utilize a substantial number. Smaller numbers of overseas military bases are operated by China, Iran, Iraq,  India, Italy, Japan, Saudi Arabia, Singapore and the United Arab Emirates.

The United States is the largest operator of military bases abroad, with 38 "named bases" with active duty, national guard, reserve, or civilian personnel as of September 30, 2014. Its largest, in terms of personnel, was Ramstein AB in Germany, with almost 9,200 personnel.

Australia
  – Butterworth Air Base, Malaysia is used for Australia's commitment to the Five Power Defence Arrangements (FPDA). In addition, the Australian Army maintains an infantry company (designated Rifle Company Butterworth) at Butterworth, Malaysia for training purposes.
  – Al Minhad Air Base, UAE used for Australian operations in the Middle East.

Bangladesh
 - a Bangladesh Military Contingent (BMC) has resided in Kuwait since the end of the 1991 Gulf War to assist the Kuwait Military Forces in logistics and other sectors under a bilateral agreement.

Canada
  – Created in 2009, the Operational Support Hub (OSH) Europe at the large Köln-Bonn Airport, Germany, is capable of operating on a 24/7 basis to access the full range of European transportation networks.
  – Created in 2016 as the OSH – Latin America and the Caribbean (LAC).  It served as the in-theatre support platform for CAF members taking part in Exercise TRADEWINDS 2016 in Jamaica.  It is capable of providing support to other CAF missions in the region, such as humanitarian assistance and disaster relief operations.  It supports Other Government Departments and Agencies operating in the area, as well as strengthening the relationship between the Canadian Armed Forces and the Jamaican Defence Forces.
  – OSH – Southwest Asia. Created in 2011 to support Canadian operations in Afghanistan following the loss of Camp Mirage in UAE.  The detachment was a transportation point where CAF personnel, materiel, and equipment were transferred between modes of transportation, particularly from air to sea.  In 2014, a new agreement with Kuwait was signed to continue supporting personnel, materiel and equipment transiting through Kuwait to and from areas of operation outside of Kuwait.  The OSH also supports CAF members and assets present in Kuwait.
  – OSH – West Africa. In Spring of 2018, an Interim Operational Support Hub (IOSH) was established at the Léopold Sédar Senghor (LSS) airport in Dakar, Senegal to support Operation (Op) PRESENCE Task Force Mali. This later became a standing OSH in West Africa. It allows the CAF to project and sustain its military forces rapidly and flexibly, providing support for CAF operations staging in or through West Africa. It ensures operational/tactical level liaison with HN and UN Logistics hub, supporting equipment receipt and customs liaison for other Canadian governmental departments and agencies as well as Canadian defence industries.

China
  – People's Liberation Army Support Base in Djibouti.
  – A military post in southeastern Gorno-Badakhshan.

France

  – Les forces françaises stationnées à Djibouti (FFDj) 
  – Forces de présence aux Emirats arabes unis  
  – Les forces françaises en Côte d'Ivoire (FFCI)  
  – Les éléments français au Gabon (EFG) 
  – Les éléments français au Sénégal (EFS) 
  – Franco-German Brigade in Müllheim and a Eurocopter Tiger training center at Faßberg Air Base
  – Several facilities in the country
  – N'Djamena Air Force Base
  – Niamey Air Force Base
  – At least three bases near Kobanî, Sarrin and Ayn Issa as part of Opération Chammal
  – Forces in Baghdad as part of Opération Chammal
  – Prince Hassan Air Base as part of Opération Chammal

Germany
  – Franco-German Brigade in Illkirch-Graffenstaden near Strasbourg and a Eurocopter Tiger training center in Le Cannet-des-Maures
  - German Liaison Office for Defense Materiel USA/Canada in Reston, Virginia where a segment of the Berlin wall is on display

Greece
  – Hellenic Force in Cyprus
  – Hellenic Force in Kosovo
  – Hellenic Force in Saudi Arabia

India
  – India funded the refurbishment of airbases at Farkhor and Western Dushanbe
  – The Indian Military Training Team (IMTRAT) permanently stationed in western Bhutan
  – A Listening post and a radar facility in northern Madagascar
  – A Listening post at Ras al Hadd and berthing rights for the Indian Navy at Muscat naval base. An establishment at Duqm for the Indian Air Force and the Indian Navy
  – India has been funding the construction of 3000 m long airfield with associated facilities to house troops on Agaléga Island.
  – The Indian government supported the construction of a system of six coastal surveillance radars in Mahe, Alphonse, Farquhar, Astove and Assumption Island which are linked to the Indian surveillance system.

Iran
  – Several military installations and facilities in Baghdad, Al Anbar and Saladin Governorate.
  – A military base near Al-Kiswah, Abu Kamal and several facilities in 3 different governorates.
  – A military training facility near Beit Moubarak and several military installations in Beqaa and Beirut Governorate.

Iraq

  – Army Training base in  Kuwait City around Hawalli Governorate.

Italy
  – Base Militare Nazionale di Supporto (BMNS), National Military Support Base.
  – Ahmad al-Jaber Air Base
  – Sheppard Air Force Base (training base), Eglin Air Force Base (training base)

Japan
  – Japan Self-Defense Force Base Djibouti

Netherlands
  – Netherlands Detachment Tucson Arizona (training base)
Overseas Territories:
  – A squadron of the Netherlands Marine Corps is permanently stationed on Aruba.
  – A Royal Netherlands Army detachment permanently stationed in Curaçao.

New Zealand
  – New Zealand Defence Support Unit

Pakistan

  – 1,180 personnel in Tabuk and other bases in permanent training and advisory roles, under a 1982 agreement.

Russia

  – 102nd Military Base and 3624th Airbase 
  – Hantsavichy Radar Station, Vileyka naval communication centre
  – 4th Military Base and 7th Military Base in the disputed  regions of South Ossetia and Abkhazia 
  – Balkhash Radar Station, Sary Shagan range, Baikonur Cosmodrome
  – Kant Air Base, 338th naval communication centre, 954th torpedo testing range and a seismograph
  – a sizeable military force in the unrecognised state of Transnistria. These forces guard Cobasna ammunition depot.
  – Russian naval facility in Tartus, Khmeimim Air Base, Shayrat Air Base
  – 201st Military Base

Saudi Arabia
  – Saudi Arabian military presence in Bahrain since the Saudi-led intervention in Bahrain in 2011 as part of the Peninsula Shield Force - the military arm of the Gulf Cooperation Council. The units sent from Saudi Arabia included 1,000 (1,200) troops along with 150 vehicles. Saudi Arabian soldiers were apparently from the Saudi Arabian National Guard, commanded by a son of King Abdullah, Prince Miteb. 
  – Military base in Djibouti.
  – Several military bases and facilities in Al Mahrah, Hadhramaut, Ma'rib, Abyan, Al Hudaydah, Taiz governorates.

Singapore
  – Flying Training School (No. 130 Squadron) (training base); Oakey Army Aviation Centre (training base)
  – Jalan Aman Camp
  - Cazaux Air Base
  – RNZAF Base Ohakea
  – Hengchun, Douliu, Hukou
  – Sai Yok Camp
  – Mountain Home Air Force Base (training base); Luke Air Force Base (training base)

Turkey

  – 24 troops in Pasha Liman Base, with 2 frigates. An Albanian-Turkish military cooperation agreement was signed in 1992 that encompassed rebuilding Albania's Pasha Liman Base by Turkey alongside granted access for Turkish use.
  – Buildings and structures in Gizil Sherg military town, and one terminal building located in the airfield in Hacı Zeynalabdin settlement. An observation base was also built by Turkey in the Nagorno-Karabakh region after the 44-day 2020 Nagorno-Karabakh war. The base was established in Aghdam under the name "Ceasefire Observation Center", and officially started to operate in January 2021 with 60 Turkish and Russian soldiers stationed at the base.
  – Turkey has signed agreement with Iraq which includes allowing the Turkish army to pursue elements of the Kurdistan Workers' Party (PKK) in northern Iraq, with the permission of, and in coordination with the Federal Government of Iraq. It also includes opening two liaison offices between Baghdad and Ankara to exchange intelligence and security information between the two countries. As of 2020, Turkey has a military base with 2,000 personnel in Bashiqa and Bamarni Air Base garrisoned with around 60 tanks, Armoured personnel carriers and one commando battalion. Turkey has more than 40+ military and intelligence bases scattered all around Iraq, the most out of any country. There are plans to build a new base in the Metina area of Duhok governorate in Iraqi Kurdistan Region as of April 2021. In total, Turkey has stationed around 5,000 to 10,000 soldiers in Iraq.
  – An estimated 321 troops serve in the Kosovo Security Battalion command. They are stationed at Sultan Murat base in the city of Prizren for UNMIK mission and KFOR peacekeeping force's.
  – Airbases at al-Watiya, Mitiga and Misrata, in addition to Zwara. The amount of Turkish soldiers stationed in Libya is unknown.
  – A total of 35,000 to 40,000 armed forces of the Republic of Turkey are currently in active duty Cyprus Turkish Peace Force Command.
  – A military base in Doha with 5,000 personnel.
  – Camp TURKSOM with 2,000 personnel.
  – Bases in Al-Bab, Al-Rai, Akhtarin, Afrin, Jindires, Rajo and Jarablus with at least 5,000 personnel in Euphrates Shield and Olive Branch regions. New bases were followed at south of Afrin canton in Atme and Darat Izza There are 114 Turkish bases in Syria as of January 2022. After operation Peace Spring, approximately 6,400 personnel are working around the Peace Spring region between Ras al-Ayn and Tell Abyad. 19 observation points are settled around Idlib and Aleppo Province. Altogether, there are an estimated 10,500 Turkish soldiers and 250 tanks stationed in Syria. These numbers are constantly subject to modifications.

United Arab Emirates 
  – A forward operating base at the Al-Khadim Airport near Marj.
  – Military base in the Port of Berbera.
  – Partial military base on Socotra and an air base at Perim.

United Kingdom

  - Pine Gap, From 2027, a British submarine will maintain a rotational presence with an American submarine at HMAS Stirling under the Submarine Rotational Force-West (SRF-W) initiative.
  (UK) – Ascension Island Auxiliary Airfield
  – United Kingdom Naval Support Facility in Bahrain (UKNSF)
  – British Army Training and Support Unit Belize
  – British Forces Brunei: Brunei Garrison
  – British Army Training Unit Suffield
  – British Forces Cyprus Akrotiri and Dhekelia, RAF Troodos
  – UK led Battlegroup in Tapa: NATO Enhanced Forward Presence 
  – British Army Germany: Westfalen Garrison
  – Al Asad Airbase
  – British Army Training Unit Kenya
  – British Gurkhas Nepal (Pokhara Camp, Dharan Station)
  – Bardufoss Air Station and Camp Viking which opened in 2023.
  – British Defence Singapore Support Unit
  – RAF Al Udeid
  – Omani-British Joint Training Area and the UK Joint Logistics Support Base
  – Al Minhad Air Base
  – MCAS Beaufort (training base), Creech Air Force Base, Edwards Air Force Base, Naval Submarine Base Kings Bay (Trident Facility)

United States

The United States has military bases in 85 countries and territories, i.e. outside its fifty states and District of Columbia. Countries with U.S. bases include:
  (Netherlands) – Queen Beatrix International Airport
  (UK) – Ascension Island Auxiliary Airfield
  – Pine Gap; Marine Rotational Force – Darwin
  – AUTEC
  – Naval Support Activity Bahrain; Isa Air Base
  – Chièvres Air Base; Kleine Brogel Air Base
  – Camp Eagle
  –  (United Kingdom) – Naval Support Facility Diego Garcia
  – Aitos Logistics Center; Bezmer Air Base; Graf Ignatievo Air Base; Novo Selo Range
  - Ouagadougou Airport
  – Contingency Location Garoua
  – Guantanamo Bay Naval Base
  – (Netherlands) – U.S. Air Force Forward Operating Base
  – Akrotiri and Dhekelia: RAF Akrotiri. The Sovereign Base Areas of Akrotiri and Dhekelia is a British Overseas Territory on the island of Cyprus. 
  – Camp Lemonnier
  – Ämari Air Base
  – U.S. Military Installations in Germany; Panzer Kaserne; Ramstein Air Base; Spangdahlem Air Base; Baumholder Army Post; Landstuhl Regional Medical Center; Sembach Army Post; 
  – Alexandroupoli Army Base, Larisa Air Base, Araxos Air Base, Syros base, Souda Bay Naval Base
  (Denmark) – Thule Air Base
  – Soto Cano Air Base
  – Pápa Air Base
  – Al Asad Airbase and several facilities in 7 different governorates
  – Dimona Radar Facility
  – Caserma Ederle-Caserma Del Din; Darby Military Community; Naval Air Station Sigonella; Naval Support Activity Naples; Aviano Air Base
  – United States Forces Japan
  – Muwaffaq Salti Air Base
  – Camp Simba, Armed Forces Research Institute of Medical Sciences
   – Camp Bondsteel
  – Ali Al Salem Air Base; Camp Arifjan; Camp Buehring; Kuwait Naval Base
  - Šiauliai Air Base
  – Volkel Air Base; USCG Activities Europe
  – Niger Air Base 101; Niger Air Base 201
  – Marine Corps garrison at Værnes Air Station
  – RAFO Masirah; RAFO Thumrait (South of Oman) 
  – Antonio Bautista Air Base; Basa Air Base; Fort Magsaysay; Lumbia Air Base; Mactan-Benito Ebuen Air Base
  – Łask Air Base
  – Lajes Field
  – Al Udeid Air Base
  – Mihail Kogălniceanu Air Base; Deveselu Military Base
  – 64th Air Expeditionary Group (inactive since 2014); Prince Sultan Air Base
  – United States drone base in Seychelles
  – Paya Lebar Air Base; Changi Naval Base, Sembawang Naval Base
  – United States Forces Korea
  – Morón Air Base; Naval Station Rota
  – Military base in Al-Tanf and several facilities in northern Syria, within U.S.-backed SDF territory
  – Armed Forces Research Institute of Medical Sciences; U-Tapao Royal Thai Navy Airfield
  – Drone base at Bizerte-Sidi Ahmed Air Base
  – Incirlik Air Base, Izmir Air Station, Kürecik Radar Station, Ankara Support Facility
  – Al Dhafra Air Base; Port of Jebel Ali; Fujairah Naval Base
  – RAF Alconbury; RAF Croughton; RAF Fairford; RAF Lakenheath; RAF Menwith Hill; RAF Mildenhall;RAF Welford

See also
Power projection

Notes

References

Further reading
 Cooley, A., & Nexon, D. (2013). “The Empire Will Compensate You”: The Structural Dynamics of the U.S. Overseas Basing Network. Perspectives on Politics, 11(4), 1034–1050.
 

 

 
Military lists
Military